This is a list of Belgian television related events from 1972.

Events

Debuts

Television shows

Ending this year

Births
22 March - Katja Retsin, TV host
24 July - Geert Hunaerts, actor
24 December - Francesca Vanthielen, TV host

Deaths